The coscoroba swan (Coscoroba coscoroba) is a species of waterfowl in subfamily Anserinae of the family Anatidae. It is found in Argentina, Bolivia, Brazil, Chile, Paraguay, Uruguay, and the Falkland Islands.

Taxonomy and systematics

The coscoroba swan's placement within the family Anatidae is not settled. A 2014 genetic study posited a phylogenetic relationship between this species and the Cape Barren goose (Cereopsis novaehollandiae). BirdLife International's Handbook of the Birds of the World has adopted this approach and places the coscoroba swan and Cape Barren goose together in tribe Cereopsini, which it places as basal to Cygnus and all other geese. However, the South American Classification Committee of the American Ornithological Society, the International Ornithological Committee (IOC), and the Clements taxonomy treat the Cape Barren goose as basal to other geese, which themselves precede the coscoroba and other swans in a linear sequence. Even those three systems differ, with the IOC placing the coscoroba before Cygnus and the other two after it in their lists.

The coscoroba swan is the only member of genus Coscoroba and has no subspecies.

Description

Males weigh  and females . Their appearance is intermediate between those of geese and true swans. The sexes have the same plumage; adults are white except for black tips to the outer six primary feathers. Although this black is often barely visible on the closed wing it is conspicuous in flight. Their beak, legs, and feet are red. The young is grayish white to brownish with a black cap and a blue-gray bill, and attains adult plumage at about eight months of age.

Distribution and habitat

The coscoroba swan is a year-round resident of central Argentina and along the Uruguay-southern Brazil coast. It also breeds but does not winter from southern Chile and Argentina south to Tierra del Fuego and occasionally on the Falkland Islands. In winter its range extends north to central Chile, northern Argentina, Paraguay, Uruguay, and southern Brazil. It has been recorded as a vagrant in Bolivia and at several locations in Brazil north of its usual limit. The coscoroba swan inhabits well-vegetated lagoons and freshwater swamps and sometimes human-made reservoirs.

Behavior

Feeding

The coscoroba swan's diet has not been studied in detail, but it apparently feeds on aquatic and some terrestrial plants, small aquatic invertebrates, and small fish. It forages mainly while swimming or wading in shallow water and in contrast to other swans seldom upends. It also grazes on land. It often feeds with black-necked swans (Cygnus melanocoryphus).

Breeding

The coscoroba swan breeds in the local spring, which is May to October in northern Argentina, July to December in Chile, and July and August in southern Brazil. The species forms long-term pair bonds. Its nest is a mound of vegetation lined with soft grass constructed by both members of a pair on a small islet, partially floating in a reedbed, or in long grass close to water. Males guard females during the incubation period of about 35 days. Both parents care for the young through fledging at 14 weeks and beyond, sometimes until they are a year old. In captivity coscoroba swans can live 20 years.

Vocalization

The coscoroba swan makes an onomatopoeic "cos-cor-oo", usually as a threat to intruders. They also make a "monosyllabic hooting note" as a contact call between mates. Immature birds make "loud chirps and trills".

Status

The IUCN has assessed the coscoroba swan as being of Least Concern. It has a large range and its estimated population of 6700 to 17,000 mature individuals is believed to be stable. No immediate threats have been identified. The species' population varies dramatically at different parts of its range, being fairly common in Argentina, uncommon in Paraguay and Uruguay, rare in Chile, and uncertain in Brazil. The "[g]reatest threat seems to be loss of temperate marsh habitats due to urbanization and agricultural developments".

Gallery

References

External links 

coscoroba swan
coscoroba swan
Birds of Argentina
Birds of the Falkland Islands
coscoroba swan